Edward A. Oates (born 1946) is an American businessman. He co-founded Software Development Labs in August 1977 with Larry Ellison, and Bob Miner. Software Development Labs later became Oracle Corporation.

Education and early employment
Ed Oates graduated with a BA in mathematics from San Jose State University in 1968, and worked at Singer, the US Army Personnel Information Systems Command (PERSINSCOM) (drafted), Ampex, and Memorex before co-founding Oracle.

Audible Difference
After retiring from Oracle in 1996 Oates purchased a high-end home theater store, Audible Difference. Oates' clients included his ex-partner Larry Ellison and Steve Jobs. In 1999 he sold Audible Difference.

Rock Your Business® LLC
In 2018 Oates co-founded Rock Your Business® LLC with Michelle Fox from Ohio to provide team building and entertainment events featuring bona fide Rock and Roll Stars to company and other organization events.

Other affiliations
Oates volunteers time on the board of directors of the San Francisco Zoological Society and the Tower Foundation Board of San Jose State University.

Personal life
In his spare time Ed skis, builds H0 scale model railroads and does video work for the Woodside Priory School Theater. He also plays guitar in the band Choc'd, and participated at Rock and Roll Fantasy Camp.

References

External links

1946 births
Living people
American computer businesspeople
American technology chief executives
American technology company founders
Oracle employees
San Jose State University alumni